Éxitos ("Hits" in Spanish) may refer to:

Éxitos (Don Chezina album), 2004
Exitos (Electric Company album), 2000
Éxitos (Fey album), 2000
 Éxitos (Tempo album), 2002
Éxitos de Floria Márquez
Éxitos de Gloria Estefan
Éxitos 98:06, by Luis Fonsi
Todos Éxitos, by Diego Torres

Other albums

10 Éxitos
10 Éxitos de Juan Gabriel

12 Éxitos
12 Super Éxitos, an album by Selena
12 Super Éxitos (Barrio Boyzz album)

15 Éxitos
15 Éxitos (disambiguation)
15 años de éxitos, by Alejandro Fernández

17 Éxitos
17 Super Éxitos by Selena
Mis Mejores Canciones:17 Super Éxitos, by Manuel Mijares

18 Éxitos 
18 éxitos de Franco De Vita

20 Éxitos
20 Años de Éxitos En Vivo con Moderatto, by Alejandra Guzmán
Personalidad: 20 Éxitos, by Ana Gabriel

30 Éxitos
30 Éxitos Insuperables (disambiguation)

See also
Éxitos y Más (disambiguation)
Grandes Éxitos (disambiguation)
Éxitos y Recuerdos, a series of compilation albums released by EMI and Capitol Records